Jason Syme (born ) is a Scottish former professional rugby league and rugby union footballer who played in the 1990s and 2000s. He played representative level rugby league (RL) for Scotland, at club level for Central Centurions, and club level rugby union (RU) for Dunfermline RFC (two spells), Heriot's Rugby Club and Kirkcaldy RFC, as a lock, or number eight. Syme was a pupil at Dollar Academy during the 1980s, and was later a student in Dundee.

International honours
Jason Syme represented Scotland (RL); he played as an interchange/substitute in the 26-6 victory over Ireland at Firhill Stadium, Glasgow on Tuesday 6 August 1996.

Genealogical information
Jason Syme is the older brother of the rugby league and rugby union footballer; Jamie Syme.

References

External links
Taste things to come as bistro get go-ahead

1972 births
Living people
Dunfermline RFC players
Heriot's RC players
Kirkcaldy RFC players
Rugby league players from Dollar, Clackmannanshire
Rugby union locks
Rugby union number eights
Rugby union players from Dollar, Clackmannanshire
Scotland national rugby league team players
Scottish rugby league players
Scottish rugby union players